Wanda Kosakiewicz (1917–1989), French theatre actress in the 1940s, was one of Jean-Paul Sartre's love interests and Olga Kosakiewicz's sister. Sartre wrote that she was one of the reasons that his friendship with Albert Camus went sour.  Her relations with both rival philosophers featured in the book The Boxer and the Goalkeeper by Andy Martin (Simon & Schuster, 2012);  she appears as Wanda in Lettres à Sartre, and Tania in Lettres au Castor.

References

French stage actresses
1917 births
1989 deaths
20th-century French actresses